Juan Ignacio O'Neill De Corral (born July 12, 1998) is a Puerto Rican football player who currently plays as a midfielder for the Assumption College soccer team, the Greyhounds.

Career statistics

International

References

1998 births
Living people
Puerto Rican footballers
Puerto Rico international footballers
Association football midfielders
People from Guaynabo, Puerto Rico
Assumption Greyhounds men's soccer players
Puerto Rico youth international footballers